Kin is a village in Ye Township in Mawlamyine District in the Mon State of south-east Myanmar. It is located on the right bank (northern side) of the Ye River.

Notes

External links
 "Kin Map — Satellite Images of Kin" Maplandia World Gazetteer

Populated places in Mon State